This article describes the qualifying of the 2014–15 EHF Champions League.

Format
Twelve teams will take part in the qualification tournaments. They were drawn into three groups of four teams, where they play a semifinal and a final or third place match. The winners of the qualification tournaments, played on 6–7 September 2014, will qualify for the group stage, while the eliminated teams will be transferred to the 2014–15 EHF Cup. The draw took place on 26 June 2014, at 14:00 local time, in Vienna, Austria.

Seedings
The seedings were published on 23 June 2014.

Qualification tournament 1
HC Meshkov Brest has the right to organize the tournament.

Bracket

Semifinals

Third place game

Final

Qualification tournament 2
Alpla HC Hard has the right to organize the tournament.

Bracket

Semifinals

Third place game

Final

Qualification tournament 3
Initia Hasselt has the right to organize the tournament.

Bracket

Semifinals

Third place game

Final

References

External links
Official website

qualifying